The men's regu sepak takraw competition at the 1998 Asian Games in Bangkok was held from 13 to 17 December at the Indoor Stadium Huamark.

Results

Preliminaries

Group A

Group B

Group C

Round 2

Group A

Group B

Knockout round

Semifinals

Final

References 

Results

Sepak takraw at the 1998 Asian Games